The Martyrs of New Guinea were Christians including clergy, teachers, and medical staff serving in New Guinea who were executed during the Japanese invasion during World War II in 1942 and 1943. A total of 333 church workers including Papuans and visiting missionaries from a range of denominations were killed during the invasion.

Japanese Invasion
After Japan entered war in the Pacific on December 7th, 1941, many civilian populations of Australia's island territories were evacuated. There were fears people of European descent would be in particular danger - along with islanders and Papuans working alongside them - but no order was issued for the evacuation of missionaries. So, many Christians voluntarily chose to continue in their voication despite the approaching danger. In January 1942 the Anglican Bishop of New Guinea, Philip Strong, advised clergy and staff to faithfully remain working in New Guinea:

“One thing only I can guarantee is that if we do not forsake Christ here in Papua in His Body, the Church, He will not forsake us. He will uphold us; He will strengthen us and He will guide us and keep us though the days that lie ahead. If we all left, it would take years for the Church to recover from our betrayal of our trust. If we remain—and even if the worst came to the worst and we were all to perish in remaining—the Church would not perish, for there would have been no breach of trust in its walls, but its foundations and structure would have received added strength for the future building by our faithfulness unto death.”

The same month Japan captured Rabaul and began its campaign south to the capital Port Moresby. During the campaign hundreds of Christians were killed by the Japanese and collaborating Papuans.

Martyrs
Reported numbers of those killed varies, but the Anglican Board of Mission (Australia) follows the University of Papua New Guinea research that there were:
 Roman Catholic - 197
 United Church - 77
 Salvation Army - 22
 Lutheran - 16
 Anglican - 12
 Evangelical Church of Manus - 5 
 Seventh Day Adventist - 4

Anglicans

John Barge, priest

Margery Brenchley, nurse

John Duffill, builder

Leslie Gariardi, evangelist and teacher 

May Hayman, nurse

Henry Holland, priest

Lilla Lashmar, teacher

Henry Matthews, priest

Lilla Lashmar, teacher

Mavis Parkinson, teacher

Vivian Redlich, priest

Lucian Tapiedi, evangelist and teacher

Catholics
On  Rabaul, Australians and Europeans who weren't evacuated found refuge at the Vunapope Catholic Mission, until the Japanese overwhelmed the island and took them prisoner in 1942. The local Bishop Leo Scharmach, a Pole, convinced the Japanese that he was German and to spare the internees. A group of indigenous Daughters of Mary Immaculate (FMI Sisters) then refused to give up their faith or abandon the Australians and are credited with keeping hundreds of internees alive for three and half years by growing food and delivering it to them over gruelling distances. Some of the Sisters were tortured by the Japanese and gave evidence during war crimes trials after the war.

Legacy
In 1950 the Right Rev’d Dr Light Shinjiro Maekawa, Anglican Bishop of South Tokyo, sent a bamboo cross to the parishes of all the Martyrs as an act of reconciliation and repentance.

A statue of Tapiedi is installed among the niches with other 20th-century Christian martyrs over the west door of Westminster Abbey in London.  His killer, taking the name Hivijapa Lucian, later converted to Christianity. He built a church dedicated to the memory of his victim, which grew to a diocesan center. However, the original building at Higatury was destroyed when Mount Lamington erupted on 21 January 1951 during a diocesan meeting, with considerable loss of life, so the church and center were rebuilt at Popondetta. Another church taking Lucian Tapiedi as its patronal saint is St Lucian's Six Mile  in the Six Mile Settlement of Port Moresby, north of Jacksons International Airport.

Veneration
The Martyrs of New Guinea are honored with memorial and feast days on the calendars of many churches including the Anglican Communion on September 2.

See also
Melanesian Brotherhood: seven religious brothers martyred in the Solomon Islands around April 24, 2003.

References

External links
Westminster Abbey: Lucian Tapiedi

History of Papua New Guinea
Papua New Guinea in World War II
1942 deaths
20th-century Protestant martyrs
20th-century Christian saints
Papua New Guinean murder victims
People murdered in Papua New Guinea
Civilians killed in World War II
Anglican saints